is an athletic stadium in Oita, Oita, Japan.

External links

Football venues in Japan
Sports venues in Ōita Prefecture
Athletics (track and field) venues in Japan
Ōita (city)
Oita Trinita